Orsai is a Paraguayan comedy film directed and written by Emiliano Gómez. It was released on August 15, 2019 by Filmagic Entertainment.

The film stars Rafael Alfaro and Paola Maltese, with Mexican actor Édgar Vivar, and Paraguayan  former footballers Ever Hugo Almeida and Carlos Alberto Gamarra as special guest stars.

References

External links 
 

2019 films
2019 comedy films
Films shot in Paraguay
Paraguayan comedy films